Sherwani is a surname. Notable people with the surname include:

Arfa Khanum Sherwani (born 1980), Indian journalist
Saleem Sherwani (field hockey forward) (born 1962)
Saleem Sherwani (field hockey goalkeeper) (born 1951)
Imran Sherwani (born 1962), English field hockey player
Jalees Sherwani (died 2018), Indian screenwriter and lyricist